Asajaya (Chinese: 雅沙再也) is a small town located in Samarahan Division, Sarawak, Malaysia.

History
Asajaya was formerly known as Nonok, and it is a sub-district under Kuching Division since 1970. From 1993, it was transferred to the newly formed Samarahan Division, and since then it was renamed as Asajaya. Asajaya was upgraded into a district on 31 December 1999.

Demographics

Transportation

Local Bus

Climate
Asajaya has a tropical rainforest climate (Af) with heavy to very heavy rainfall year-round.

References

External links

 Official Website of Asajaya District Office

Districts of Sarawak
Samarahan Division